Robert Arthur Carruthers is a Canadian former politician. He represented the electoral district of Hants East in the Nova Scotia House of Assembly from 1993 to 1998. He was a member of the Nova Scotia Liberal Party.

A graduate of Saint Mary's University and Dalhousie Law School, Carruthers started his own law firm in 1980. After serving two terms as a municipal councillor, Carruthers entered provincial politics in the 1993 election, winning the Hants East riding by 638 votes. A backbench member of the John Savage government, Carruthers was named caucus whip in 1996. Carruthers did not reoffer in the 1998 election.

References

Living people
Nova Scotia Liberal Party MLAs
People from Hants County, Nova Scotia
Lawyers in Nova Scotia
Schulich School of Law alumni
Saint Mary's University (Halifax) alumni
Nova Scotia municipal councillors
Year of birth missing (living people)